Zhilino (Jilino) is a rural locality (a village) in Ufa, Bashkortostan, Russia. The population was 170 as of 2010. There are 25 streets.

Geography 
Zhilino is located 15 km southeast of Ufa. Karpovo is the nearest rural locality.

References 

Rural localities in Ufa urban okrug